Tineopsis is a genus of moths in the subfamily Arctiinae. It contains the single species Tineopsis saturata, which is found on Ambon Island.

References

Natural History Museum Lepidoptera generic names catalog

Lithosiini